Urubu or Urubú may refer to:

 Urubu River (disambiguation), several rivers
 Urubu people (Ka'apor)
 Urubu language
 Urubu (album), a 1976 album by Antonio Carlos Jobim
 Urubu (film), an American film
 I.Ae. 41 Urubú, a glider built in Argentina